I Am Heath Ledger is a 2017 Paramount Network documentary film about actor Heath Ledger, who died in 2008. Directed by Adrian Buitenhuis and Derik Murray, the film presents interviews with Ledger's family and friends.

Featured cast of subjects
 Heath Ledger as himself (archive footage)
 Ben Harper as himself, musician and friend of Ledger's
 N'fa as himself, musician and friend of Ledger's 
 Ben Mendelsohn as himself, actor and friend of Ledger’s
 Naomi Watts as herself, actress and ex-partner of Ledger’s
 Djimon Hounsou as himself, actor
 Emile Hirsch as himself, actor
 Ang Lee as himself, filmmaker
 Matt Amato as himself, filmmaker
 Catherine Hardwicke as herself, filmmaker
 Edward Lachman as himself, filmmaker
 Christina Cauchi as herself, model and ex-partner of Ledger’s
 Justin Vernon as himself, musician (Bon Iver)
 Mia Doi Todd as herself, musician 
 Grace Woodroofe as herself, musician
 Carlos Niño as himself, music producer 
 Steve Alexander as himself, agent
 Gerry Grennell as himself, dialect coach
 Ledger's parents Sally and Kim, sisters Kate, Olivia and Ashleigh, and childhood friends

Notably Michelle Williams, ex-partner of Ledger and mother of his daughter Matilda, was not in the film.

Production
Ledger's family agreed to participate only after Williams "gave her blessing" and when Ledger's friend Matt Amato got involved in the project.

References

External links

2017 films
2017 documentary films
English-language Canadian films
Documentary films about actors
Films directed by Derik Murray
Canadian docufiction films
Heath Ledger
2010s Canadian films